The 1999–2000 A Group was the 52nd season of the A Football Group, the top Bulgarian professional league for association football clubs, since its establishment in 1948.

Overview
It was contested by 16 teams, and Levski Sofia won the championship.

Team information

Stadia and locations
The following teams have ensured their participation in A Group for season 1999–00 (listed in alphabetical order):

League standings

Results

Relegation play-off

Champions
Levski Sofia

Top scorers

Source:1999–2000 Top Goalscorers

References

External links
Bulgaria Championship History at rsssf.com
1999–2000 A Group Statistics at a-pfg.com

First Professional Football League (Bulgaria) seasons
Bul
1